The Kamov Ka-226 (NATO reporting name: Hoodlum) is a small, twin-engine Russian utility helicopter. The Ka-226 features an interchangeable mission pod, rather than a conventional cabin, allowing the use of various accommodation or equipment configurations. The Ka-226 entered service in 2002.

Development 
A twin-turbine version of the successful reciprocating-engined Kamov Ka-26, (the Kamov Ka-126 is the single-turbine version) the Ka-226 was initially announced in 1990. Originally developed to meet the requirements of the Russian disaster relief ministry, the aircraft first flew on 4 September 1997. Certification to Russian AP-29 "A" and "B" transport categories was granted on 31 October 2003. The Ka-226 entered production at "Motor Sich", Zaporozhye, Ukraine.

In December 2014 it was reported that India is in agreement with the Russian Federation to produce Ka-226T and Mi-17 on its territory. Under a 2011 contract with Russian Ministry of Defence, Kumertau Aviation Production Enterprise completed production of a batch of Ka-226.80 helicopters, which was delivered to the customer on 17 April 2015. "The planned scope of the assignment of state contract signed with the Ministry of Defence in 2011 fully implemented with ahead of schedule deliveries. Prematurely delivered a large consignment of helicopters. Previously, under the state contract with the Russian Defence Ministry were also delivered several Ka-226.80 batches", - said the Managing Director of Kumertau Aviation Production Enterprise (KumAPP) Viktor Novikov.

In April 2015 Certification of Ka-226T light multi-role helicopter powered by Turbomeca Arrius 2G engines from France has been successfully completed in Russia. Two Ka-226T helicopters took part in the flight test programme. The version of Ka-226T powered by Turbomeca Arrius 2G engines offers much better performance compared to production Ka-226s powered by Allison 250-C20R/2 engines. It was reported earlier that deliveries of Ka-226 helicopters manufactured by Kumertau Aviation Production Enterprise (Ka-226.50 and Ka-226.80 versions) and powered by Allison 250-C20R/2 engines were started in 2005. The helicopters were delivered to the Federal Security Service of Russian Federation (at least six vehicles), Russian Ministry of Internal Affairs (11 vehicles), Russian air forces (a total of 36 helicopters should be delivered) and Ukrainian Ministry of Emergency Situations (1 helicopter). Next year the enterprise was to start implementation of a contract for delivery of 18 Ka-226TG helicopters to Gazpromavia. In late March 2017 Russian security structures received first 2 ship-based Ka-226Ts and the delivery of six helicopters was completed in April 2018. In March 2018 Russia issued a supplement to the certificate for Ka-226T helicopter that allows the machine to operate at high temperatures.

Following selection of the Ka-226T to meet an India requirement for 197 helicopters, an agreement was signed in December 2015 for the creation of a joint venture between Rostec, Russian Helicopters and Hindustan Aeronautics to build the helicopters at a new factory to be built at Tumakuru in India.

Design 
The design is a refinement of the proven Ka-26, featuring interchangeable mission pods. The aircraft is fitted with a new rotor system, increased visibility nose, and new passenger cabin design. The Ka-226 also features a new transmission system and is made largely from composite materials.

The aircraft is fitted with trademark Kamov coaxial rotors, of advanced composite design, making the Ka-226 highly manoeuvrable and eliminating the need for a tail rotor.

Variants 

Search and rescue, medivac, disaster relief and patrol variants have been developed for the Russian Emergency Ministry. Air ambulance, police and fire fighting variants have been developed for the Russian government.

Ka-226 Utility helicopter.
Ka-226AG Gazprom specific variant.
Ka-226T Instead of Rolls-Royce 250C engines, this variant is fitted with the more powerful Turbomeca Arrius 2G1. Each engine provides 670 shp, increasing the service ceiling to around 7,000 m, providing improved high altitude and high temperature operation. Helicopter has new avionics with multifunctional displays, automatic control system, navigation system, radar. It can be equipped with hoist system, helicopter sling, searchlight, additional external fuel tank. For search and rescue missions helicopter can be equipped with medical module. 

Ka-226TG Gazprom specific variant based on Ka-226T model.

Operators 

Indian Army (135 planned) 
Indian Air Force (65 planned)

Russian Air Force (36) 
Federal Security Service (6 on order)
Police of Russia

Ukrainian Naval Aviation (1)

Syrian Arab Air Force (at least 2)

Specifications (Ka-226T)

See also

References

External links 

 www.aviation.ru

Kamov aircraft
1990s Soviet and Russian civil utility aircraft
1990s Soviet and Russian helicopters
Coaxial rotor helicopters
Twin-turbine helicopters
Aircraft first flown in 1997
Modular aircraft

sv:Kamov Ka-226